Kashif Nisar is a Pakistani television director, producer and screenwriter, and the nephew of Pakistani TV Director Tariq Mairaj. 

He is known for directing artistic drama serials.  Kashif's most notable works are Dumpukht - Aatish-e-Ishq, O Rungreza, Ranjha Ranjha Kardi, and Inkaar for which he was nominated for several Lux Style Awards and a Hum Award.

He won the Lux Style Award for Best Television Director for Dar Si Jaati Hai Sila and Ranjha Ranjha Kardi in 2019 and 2020, respectively.

Filmography

Awards and nominations

|-
|Rowspan="2"|2009
|Best TV Director / Khuda Zameen Se Gya Nahi Hai
|Rowspan="3"|Lux Style Awards
|
|-
|Best TV Writer / Jinnah Ke Naam
|
|-
|2013
|Best Television Director / Mein
|
|-
|2014
|Best Director Drama Serial / Ullu Baraye Farokht Nahi
|Hum Awards
| 
|-
|2014
|Best Television Director / Ullu Baraye Farokht Nahi
|Rowspan="9"|Lux Style Awards
|
|-
|2015
|Best Television Director / Sannata
|
|-
|2017
|Best Television Director / Dumpukht - Aatish-e-Ishq
|
|-
|2018
|Best Television Director / O Rangreza
|
|-
|2019
|Best Television Director / Dar Si Jaati Hai Sila
|
|-
|Rowspan="2"|2020
|Best Television Director / Inkaar
|
|-
|Best Television Director / Ranjha Ranjha Kardi
|
|-
|rowspan="2"|2022
|Best Television Director / Raqeeb Se
|
|-
|Best Television Director / Dil Na Umeed To Nahi
|
|}

References

External links
 Kashif Nisar Biography on Video Pakistan
 

Living people
People from Karachi
Pakistani television directors
Year of birth missing (living people)